Hansruedi Blatter (born 1936, died 1971) was a Swiss footballer who played for FC Basel in the 1950s. Blatter played as goalkeeper. 

Blatter joined FC Basel's first team in their 1955–56 season under trainer Béla Sárosi. After one friendly match, Blatter played his domestic league debut for  his club on 20 May 1956 in the away game as Basel drew goalless against Lugano.

Blatter played three seasons for Basel and in total he played 15 games. Six of these games were in the Nationalliga A and nine were friendly games.

References

Sources
 Die ersten 125 Jahre. Publisher: Josef Zindel im Friedrich Reinhardt Verlag, Basel. 
 Verein "Basler Fussballarchiv" Homepage
(NB: Despite all efforts, the editors of these books and the authors in "Basler Fussballarchiv" have failed to be able to identify all the players, their date and place of birth or date and place of death, who played in the games during the early years of FC Basel)

FC Basel players
Swiss men's footballers
Association football goalkeepers
1936 births
1971 deaths